Top Country Albums is a chart that ranks the top-performing country music albums in the United States, published by Billboard.  In 1965, 11 different albums topped the chart, which was at the time published under the title Hot Country Albums, based on sales reports submitted by a representative sample of stores nationwide.

In the issue of Billboard dated January 2, Buck Owens and his backing band the Buckaroos were at number one with Together Again/My Heart Skips a Beat, the album's seventh week in the top spot.  The following week it was displaced by another album by Owens, I Don't Care, which went on to spend 13 consecutive weeks atop the chart, before being in turn replaced by I've Got a Tiger By the Tail, also by Owens.  This album also spent 13 weeks at number one, meaning that Owens occupied the top spot without interruption from the start of the year until early July.  I've Got a Tiger by the Tail returned to number one for two further weeks in September and Owens went on to spend one week atop the chart in October with his fourth number-one album of the year, Before You Go, giving him a total of 30 weeks spent at number one in 1965.  Owens was one of the biggest stars in country music in the mid-1960s, achieving a run of 15 consecutive number ones on the Hot Country Singles chart between 1963 and 1967.

The album which finally ended Owens' run at number one was the self-titled debut album by Connie Smith.  It was the first album by a female artist to top the country albums chart, approximately 18 months after it had first been published.  The album spent a total of seven weeks atop the chart in two separate runs, and Smith returned to number one in the issue of Billboard dated December 25 with Cute 'n' Country, which was the year's final number-one album.  She was one of two artists other than Buck Owens to achieve two number ones in 1965.  In the same year she set a record for the longest run by a female artist at number one on the Hot Country Singles chart which would stand for nearly 50 years.  Eddy Arnold also took two albums to the top of the chart in 1965.  He had been one of the biggest country music stars of the late 1940s and early 1950s before his career went into a decline.  He revived his fortunes in the mid-1960s by embracing the "Nashville sound", a newer style of country music which eschewed elements of the earlier honky-tonk style in favour of smooth productions which had a broader appeal, and went on to achieve a second run of success.  In October, Jim Reeves reached number one with Up Through the Years; this was a posthumous chart-topper for the singer, who had died in an airplane crash the previous July.

Chart history

References

1965-related lists
1965
1965 record charts